Yew is a common name given to various species of trees.

It is most prominently given to any of various coniferous trees and shrubs in the genus Taxus:
 European yew or common yew (Taxus baccata)
 Pacific yew or western yew (Taxus brevifolia)
 Canadian yew (Taxus canadensis)
 Chinese yew (Taxus chinensis)
 Japanese yew (Taxus cuspidata)
 Florida yew (Taxus floridana)
 Mexican yew (Taxus globosa)
 Sumatran yew (Taxus sumatrana)
 Himalayan yew (Taxus wallichiana)
 Taxus masonii (Eocene fossil yew)

It is also used for any of various coniferous plants in the families Taxaceae and Cephalotaxaceae:
 White-berry yew (Pseudotaxus chienii)
 New Caledonian yew or southern yew (Austrotaxus spicata)
 Catkin-yew (Amentotaxus sp.)
 Plum-yew (Cephalotaxus sp.)

Various coniferous plants in the family Podocarpaceae, superficially similar to other yews, are also known by this name:
 Prince Albert's yew (Saxegothaea conspicua)
 Plum-yew (Prumnopitys sp.)

Shrubs